Shailendra Patel is an Indian politician of the Indian National Congress party from Madhya Pradesh. He lost the Vidhansabha election.

Political career
He became an MLA of the Madhya Pradesh Legislative Assembly in 2013.

In 2017 he confronted Chief Minister of Madhya Pradesh Shivraj Singh Chouhan over why he did not visit Ichhawar, since he became the CM in 2005.

Patel was candidate for 2019 Indian general election from Vidisha (Lok Sabha constituency).

See also
Madhya Pradesh Legislative Assembly
2013 Madhya Pradesh Legislative Assembly election
2008 Madhya Pradesh Legislative Assembly election

References

Madhya Pradesh MLAs 2013–2018
Indian National Congress politicians from Madhya Pradesh
Living people
1976 births